The Golden Year is a musical play by Jack Hulbert and Barry Baker written for BBC Television, starring Hulbert with Sally Ann Howes and Peter Graves, with original music by Harry S. Pepper. It was first broadcast on 23 June and 2 July 1951.

A contribution to the Festival of Britain, the claim was made that the play was the first musical comedy ever produced for television. The BBC Year Book commented that "Jack Hulbert was featured in Festival style". Filmed in black and white, the musical has a length of 104 minutes.

Jack Hulbert, Walton Anderson, Eric Robinson, Eunice Crowther, and the George Mitchell Choir had previously worked together for BBC Television on a production of Cinderella first broadcast on 27 December 1947, and most of them came together for a new Cinderella in 1950 which like The Golden Year starred Sally Ann Howes.

Crew

Producer: Walton Anderson
Writer and producer: Jack Hulbert
Writer: Barry Baker
Lyrics: Jimmy Dyrenforth
Original music composed by: Harry S. Pepper
Special orchestrations: Arthur Wilkinson
Dance arrangers: Irving Davies, Eunice Crowther
Orchestra direction: Eric Robinson
Settings: Richard Greenough

Cast

Jack Hulbert: John Radlett
Sally Ann Howes: Susan Halliday
Peter Graves: David Grenleigh
Willoughby Gray: Sir Norman Grenleigh
Daisy Burrell: Lady Grenleigh
Paddy Stone: Jem Heath
Vi Stevens: Mrs Robinson
Eunice Crowther: Jane Radlett
Irving Davies: Tony Martin
Victor Platt: Charlie Perkins
Janice Edgard: Betty Willis
Patricia Clare: Charm Sister
Eleanor Fazan: Charm Sister
The George Mitchell Choir

References

External links
 

1951 musicals
BBC television musicals